was a Japanese actor and son of novelist Takeo Arishima. Mori appeared in many of Akira Kurosawa's films such as Rashomon, The Idiot and The Bad Sleep Well. He also starred in pictures by Kenji Mizoguchi (Ugetsu), Mikio Naruse (Floating Clouds) and other prominent directors.

Selected filmography

Films

Television

External links

Japanese male film actors
People from Sapporo
1911 births
1973 deaths
20th-century Japanese male actors